This is a sortable table of the approximately 676 townlands in County Louth, Ireland. A plain version of this list showing townland names only is also available for easy alphabetical navigation and convenient overview.

Duplicate names occur where there is more than one townland with the same name in the county. Names marked in bold typeface are towns and villages, and the word Town appears for those entries in the Acres column.

Townland list

References

 
Louth
Louth
Townlands